The 1st Lithuanian Vanguard Regiment was a military unit of the Grand Duchy of Lithuania. The full name was 1st Advance Guard Regiment of HM the Grand Duke of Lithuania.

History

Origins 
Formed in 1776 as light ulans from light cavalry banners and was called an uhlan regiment.

Great Sejm 1788-1792
The regiment was stationed in Anykščiai & Rechytsa (1789), Khalopyenichy (1790), Vidžiai (1792).

War of 1792 
The regiment fought in the:

 Battle of Mistibava on 10 July 1792
 Battle of Voiškiai on 14 July 1792

After the Polish-Lithuanian Commonwealth 

References 

Military units and formations established in 1776
Cavalry regiments of Lithuania